How Hard It Is is the fourth and final studio album by Big Brother and the Holding Company, released in August 1971. The track "Buried Alive in the Blues" was originally written by guest singer Nick Gravenites for Janis Joplin who died before she could record her vocal. It was included as an instrumental by the Full Tilt Boogie Band on her final album Pearl released the year before.

Track listing
"How Hard It Is" (David Getz, Sam Andrew) – 4:21
"You've Been Talkin' 'Bout Me, Baby" (Ray Rivera, Gale Garnett, Walter Hirsch) – 3:27
"House on Fire" (Getz, Louis Rappaport) – 3:56
"Black Widow Spider" (Andrew) – 3:32
"Last Band on Side One" (Roscoe Segel, Andrew) – 1:57
"Nu Boogaloo Jam" (Dan Nudelman, Andrew) – 3:24
"Maui" (Segel, Andrew) – 3:27
"Shine On" (Getz, Peter Albin, Andrew) – 5:25
"Buried Alive in the Blues" (Nick Gravenites) – 3:59
"Promise Her Anything But Give Her Arpeggio" (David Schallock) – 3:55

Personnel
Big Brother and the Holding Company
Sam Andrew - guitar, vocals
David Schallock - lead guitar
James Gurley - bass
Peter Albin - guitar, bass, mandolin, vibraslap
David Getz - drums, percussion, marimba, piano
with:
Kathi McDonald - vocals on "Black Widow Spider"
Mike Finnigan - vocals, keyboards on "How Hard It Is", "You've Been Talkin' 'Bout Me, Baby", "House on Fire", "Shine On" and "Buried Alive in the Blues"
Nick Gravenites - vocals on "Buried Alive in the Blues"
Technical
David Brown, George Engfer, George Horn, Mike Larner - recording
Dennis Nolan - artwork

References

1971 albums
Big Brother and the Holding Company albums
Columbia Records albums